The Oder–Havel Canal is a German canal built between 1908 and 1914, originally known as the Hohenzollern Canal, mostly replacing the Finow Canal. Together with Hohensaaten-Friedrichsthaler Wasserstraße, the Oderhaltung and the Schwedter Querfahrt it forms the Havel-Oder-Wasserstraße. It runs from the town of Cedynia near the city of Szczecin on the Oder River between Germany and Poland to the Havel, a tributary of the Elbe, near Berlin.

In 1934 a ship lift was built on the canal, near Niederfinow.
The dimensions of the caisson are 85 x 12 x 2.5 m. It could lift vessels of up to 1000 tonnes displacement.

History
The assumed start of the actual Oder–Havel Canal is the current mouth of the Oranienburger Havel. It leads through the Lehnitzsee, which previously did not belong to the Havel, and reaches the Lehnitzschleuse. Most of the canal follows the former Malz Canal and then replaces the older Finow Canal up to its eastern end. Its top parting extends from the headwater of the Lehnitz lock to the Niederfinow boat lift. The natural resources of the catchment areas of the Havel and the advertising water and, in the event of drought, the Müritz-Havel waterway and the Elde are used to supply the water to the vertex.

References

External links

Federal Statistical Office, Germany list of Navigable canals of over 80 km of length - has some basic facts about the Oder–Havel Canal.

Canals in Brandenburg
Federal waterways in Germany
Canals opened in 1914
COderHavel
Buildings and structures in Oberhavel